The Houx–Hoefer–Rehkop House is a historic home located at Higginsville, Lafayette County, Missouri.  It was built about 1882, and is a two-story, "T"-plan, Italianate style brick dwelling with a hipped roof. It features a front porch with four round columns and two pilasters all with Corinthian order capitals.

It was listed on the National Register of Historic Places in 1983.

References

Houses on the National Register of Historic Places in Missouri
Italianate architecture in Missouri
Houses completed in 1882
Houses in Lafayette County, Missouri
National Register of Historic Places in Lafayette County, Missouri